A sports-related curse is a superstitious belief in the effective action of some power or evil, that is used to explain the failures or misfortunes of specific sports teams, players, or even cities. Teams, players, and cities often cite a "curse" for many negative things, such as their inability to win a sports championship, or unexpected injuries.

American football

Detroit Lions
In 1958, the Detroit Lions traded Bobby Layne to the Pittsburgh Steelers, with Layne responding to the trade by supposedly saying that the Lions would "not win for 50 years". The veracity of this story has been disputed, particularly because the quote was never published at the time.

Despite this, in the 50 years after the trade, the Lions accumulated the worst winning percentage of the 12 teams in the National Football League (NFL) at the time, and are still one of only two franchises that were in the NFL prior to 1966 that have not yet played in the Super Bowl. The Lions' lone playoff win came against the Dallas Cowboys following the 1991 season.

When the Pittsburgh Steelers won their fifth Super Bowl championship in 2006, they won it at Ford Field, the Lions' current home stadium. Two years later – in the last year of the supposed curse – the Steelers won their sixth Super Bowl championship, while the Lions finished 0–16, the first team to lose every game of a 16-game season.

Philadelphia Eagles

 
This alleged curse supposedly prevented the Philadelphia Eagles franchise from winning the Super Bowl until Super Bowl LII.
 
The origin of this curse dates back to 1960, when the Eagles defeated the Vince Lombardi-coached Green Bay Packers to win the NFL Championship, which would be the only playoff loss in Lombardi's coaching career.
 
Following Lombardi's death in 1970, the League named the Super Bowl trophy in honor of his memory and his legacy.
 
This renaming of the trophy, combined with the Eagles' failures to win another Championship after 1960, led some Eagles fans to believe the franchise was cursed by Vince Lombardi: that being the only team to beat Lombardi in a playoff game meant never winning the trophy named after him.
 
During that time, the Eagles accumulated playoff heartbreaks that included two Super Bowl losses (to the then Oakland Raiders and New England Patriots), and three consecutive NFC Championship Game losses in 2001, 2002, and 2003.
 
The curse was broken in 2017 when the Eagles defeated the Patriots in Super Bowl LII to win their first Championship in 57 years – by coincidence, the Eagles' Championship drought lasted the same length as Lombardi's life.

Madden NFL

Prior to 1999, every annual installment of the Madden NFL video game franchise primarily featured John Madden on its cover. In 1999, Electronic Arts selected San Francisco 49ers running back Garrison Hearst to appear on the PAL version's cover, and has since featured one of the league's top players on every annual installment despite Madden's opposition.
While appearing on the cover has become an honor akin to appearing on the Wheaties box, much like the Sports Illustrated cover jinx, certain players who appeared on the Madden video game box art have experienced a decline in performance, usually due to an injury.

Super Bowl

The Super Bowl curse or Super Bowl hangover is a phrase referring to one of two things that occur in the National Football League (NFL): Super Bowl participant clubs that follow up with lower-than-expected performance the following year, and NFL teams that do not repeat as Super Bowl champions.

The phrase has been used to explain both why losing teams may post below-average winning percentages in the following year and why Super Bowl champions seldom return to the title game the following year. The term has been used since at least 1992, when The Washington Post commented that "the Super Bowl Curse has thrown everything it's got at the Washington Redskins. The Jinx that has bedeviled defending champs for 15 years has never been in better form". The phenomenon is attributed by football commentator and former NFL manager Charley Casserly to such elements as "a shorter offseason, contract issues, [and] more demand for your players' time". Casserly also notes that "once the season starts, you become the biggest game on everybody's schedule." Alleged curse notwithstanding, multiple teams have indeed repeated as Super Bowl champions, including the Green Bay Packers in the first two Super Bowls, the Pittsburgh Steelers twice in the 1970s, the Miami Dolphins also in the 1970s, the San Francisco 49ers in 1989 and 1990, the Dallas Cowboys in the 1990s, the Denver Broncos also in the 1990s, and the New England Patriots in the 2000s (decade), and there are multiple cases of teams reaching the conference championship or further up to four times in a row, including the 1990s Cowboys and Buffalo Bills, the 2000s Philadelphia Eagles, early 2010s San Francisco 49ers, the late 2010s-early 2020s Kansas City Chiefs (the latter two coached by Andy Reid), and most notably the 2010s New England Patriots who went to 8 straight AFC title games from 2011 through 2018, including three straight Super Bowl appearances from 2016 to 2018 winning two of them (Super Bowl LI) at the end of the 2016 season and Super Bowl LIII following the 2018 season.

Association football

Aaron Ramsey
Online users and tabloid journalists have written of a "Curse of Ramsey", in which celebrities die within hours or days of Welsh footballer Aaron Ramsey scoring regardless of where he plays. The phenomenon has been brought up after high-profile deaths such as those of Ted Kennedy, Osama bin Laden, Muammar Gaddafi, Steve Jobs, Whitney Houston, Robin Williams, Paul Walker, David Bowie, Alan Rickman, Nancy Reagan, Chester Bennington, Tommy Smith, Gregg Allman, Roger Moore, Stephen Hawking, Eric Bristow, Burt Reynolds, Mac Miller, George H. W. Bush, Keith Flint, Luke Perry, Gugu Liberato, Hosni Mubarak, Max von Sydow, June Brown and Olivia Newton-John, among others, coming in short time periods after every match where Ramsey scored.

Argentina national team (The curse of Tilcara)
Before the 1986 FIFA World Cup, the Argentina national football team’s manager Carlos Bilardo, along with the players found a place called Tilcara, in which to prepare for the tournament. Bilardo prayed to the Virgin of Copacabana and promised that if Argentina won the World Cup, they would come back and thank the virgin for his work. Argentina went on to win the World Cup a month later but Bilardo and his team did not keep their promise.

Their ungratefulness was believed to have led to a curse, which started during the 1990 FIFA World Cup, where Argentina lost to Cameroon in a shock motion. They did go on to reach the final but were defeated by West Germany.

From then, Argentina were knocked out of further World Cups, starting with Romania in the 1994 round of 16, the 1998 quarter-finals against the Netherlands, 2002 in the group stage, three defeats to Germany in the quarter-finals in 2006 and 2010 and the 2014 final and against France in the 2018 round of 16. Their Copa América campaigns did not fare much better after the 1993 edition, where they were runners-up four times in 2004, 2007, 2015 and 2016 and finished third in 2019, as well as being humiliatingly eliminated by Uruguay in the 2011 quarter-finals on home soil.

Bilardo attempted to deny any involvement, but the local populace confirmed the team's arrival, angering a portion of Argentine fans who accused the 1986 winners of betraying their promises. Because of this, the remaining players of the 1986 squad would eventually return to Tilcara to redeem for their failure to honour the promises and asked for forgiveness. Afterwards, Argentina won three major tournaments in a row: the 2021 Copa América, the 2022 Finalissima and the 2022 FIFA World Cup, finally breaking the curse.

Australia national team
In a story told in Johnny Warren's 2002 autobiography, Sheilas, Wogs and Poofters, during a trip to play against Rhodesia (now Zimbabwe) in the 1970 Mexico World Cup qualifiers in Mozambique, members of the Australia national soccer team (nicknamed the "Socceroos"), including Warren, consulted a witch doctor preceding their game. The witch doctor buried bones near the goal-posts and cursed the opposition, and Australia went on to beat Rhodesia 3–1 in the decider. However, the move backfired when the players could not come up with the £1000 demanded by the witch doctor as payment, so he cursed their team instead. Subsequently, the Socceroos failed to beat Israel and did not qualify.

Whilst the curse is used as an explanation for Australia failing to qualify for the World Cup for 32 years, including in the last match in the 1994, 1998 and 2002 qualifications, it is used in particular reference to the circumstances in which they failed to qualify for the 1998 tournament: needing a win against Iran in the final match of qualification, they drew 2–2, despite having led 2–0 in the second half of the match.

The curse was supposedly lifted by John Safran during episode 7 of his 2004 TV series John Safran vs God. After reading the story in Warren's book, Safran travelled to Mozambique and hired a new witch doctor to channel the original to reverse the curse. The following year, the Socceroos not only qualified for the 2006 World Cup, but reached the second round before being beaten by eventual champions Italy in Kaiserslautern. The Socceroos have since qualified for the 2010, 2014, 2018 and 2022 World Cups, with the latter saw Australia's most successful World Cup performance up to date.

Australia did appear in the 1974 FIFA World Cup after the curse had been placed. However, they failed to score a goal in any of their three opening round matches, and were eliminated.

Bayer Leverkusen

German Bundesliga club Bayer 04 Leverkusen were given the nicknames "Neverkusen", "Vizekusen" (vize meaning "second" in German) and "Bridesmaid of Europe" for its record during the 1990s to 2000s of reaching finals of major tournaments but failing to win, or finishing runner-up in the league. Bayer were runners-up in the Bundesliga for three out of four seasons between 1998–99 and 2001–02) and as of the 2022–23 season, have yet to win the title. The nicknames were popularised after the 2001–02 season when the club finished runner-up in the two major domestic competitions (league and cup) and the Champions League. Additionally, the German national team which finished runner-up to Brazil at the 2002 FIFA World Cup featured five Leverkusen players.

Benfica
Béla Guttmann, a former Hungarian footballer and then manager, joined Benfica in 1959 and coached the Portuguese club to two Primeira Liga titles, one Portuguese Cup and two European Cups. In 1962, after his second European Cup title, he reportedly asked for a pay raise but had his request turned down despite the great success he achieved at the Lisbon club, also having his contract terminated. Then, he allegedly said: "Not in a hundred years from now will Benfica ever be European champions." Benfica has appeared in five European Cup/UEFA Champions League finals and three UEFA Cup/UEFA Europa League finals since 1962 and did not win any. The alleged curse also extended to the UEFA Youth League, as Benfica's under-19 team lost three finals before winning the competition in 2021–22, thus breaking the "curse".

The veracity of this "curse", however, is disputed, as in April 1963, in an interview to A Bola, Guttmann stated: "Benfica, at this moment, are well served and do not need me. They will win the Campeonato Nacional and will be champions of Europe again." According to David Bolchover, in his biography of Guttmann, the alleged curse was first mentioned in May 1988 by newspaper Gazeta dos Desportos, the day Benfica played their fifth final. The "curse" had its origins in March 1968 when A Bola published a loose and unsigned translation from German to Portuguese of an interview given by Guttmann to Sport-Illustrierte five months earlier, in October 1967. Moreover, in November 2011, Eusébio, who was coached by Guttmann, also denied the existence of the curse, calling it a "lie".

Birmingham City

English football side Birmingham City F.C. played 100 years under an alleged curse from 1906 to 2006. As the legend goes, the club moved from nearby Muntz Street into its current location at St Andrew's, building the stadium on land that was being used by the Romani people. After they were forced to move, the angry Romani people put a 100-year hex on the stadium.

Throughout the years many Birmingham City managers would try to remove the curse but with little success. Former manager Ron Saunders tried to banish the curse in the 1980s by placing crucifixes on floodlights and painting the bottom of his players' boots red. Another manager, Barry Fry, in charge from 1993 to 1996, urinated in all four corners of the pitch after a clairvoyant said it would break the spell. On Boxing Day 2006 the curse was finally lifted and on that day Birmingham City celebrated a 2–1 win over Queens Park Rangers F.C. Just over four years after the alleged curse ended, Birmingham City finally won the first major final in their history – beating Arsenal 2–1 to win the 2010–11 Football League Cup. Birmingham City were relegated to the Football League Championship later that season, and have not been promoted back to the Premier League since.

Brazil's World Cup European knockout curse
After winning the 2002 FIFA World Cup against Germany, Brazil has been eliminated in every subsequent edition by a European team in the knock-out stage of the tournament, having lost to France in 2006, Netherlands in 2010, own Germany in 2014, Belgium in 2018, and Croatia in 2022. Additionally, four of these five losses (except in 2014, where they lost humiliatingly by 7–1 at home to Germany in the semi-finals) were in the quarterfinals.

Cruz Azul (Comizzo curse)
Origins of the curse began during the final of the Mexican League winter tournament in 1997, contested between Cruz Azul and Club León in a two-legged match. At the time they were the 3rd and fourth teams with the most league championships in Mexico respectively. Both teams were tied until the last moments of the second leg when Leon's goalkeeper Ángel Comizzo kicked Cruz Azul's star striker Carlos Hermosillo in the face, causing Hermosillo to bleed profusely inside the penalty area, leading to a foul and a penalty kick in Cruz Azul's favor. As the penalty was given, the referee asked Hermosillo to wipe the blood from his face, but Hermosillo ignored him and took the penalty kick, scoring a late winner. Cruz Azul became league champion for the eighth time in club history, but fans believed that both teams were cursed by the blood. Leon was then relegated to an inferior league in 2002 but since 2012 they were promoted back to the now-renamed Liga MX (formerly Primera División) and would later become back-to-back league champions after defeating Club América in the 2013 Apertura playoffs, breaking their part of the curse.
 		 		
On the other hand, Cruz Azul had lost several finals in the Mexican league, the CONCACAF Champions League, and the Copa Libertadores, many of them at the last minute, which had their part in the curse hold true. While Cruz Azul won the 2013 Clausura edition of the Copa MX and the CONCACAF Champions League in 2014, the club had yet to win their first league championship since 1997. Their multiple losses and inability to win any league championship has rival club fans bestow Cruz Azul with the mock title "Sub-Campeonísimos" (literally  "Supreme Runner ups".)  Additionally, the term "'Cruzazulear'" (Cruzazul-ing) was coined to describe whenever the team (or any team in general) loses in a humiliating fashion at the last minutes. The word is now in observation by the Royal Spanish Academy

The "curse" was eventually broken at the end of the 2021 Clausura finals, when Cruz Azul defeated Santos Laguna 2–1 on aggregate, thus achieving their first league title in over 23 years, and ninth overall.

Derby County F.C.
English football side Derby County were placed under a curse by a group of Romani Gypsies who were forced to move from a camp so that they could build their stadium, the Baseball Ground. The curse was that Derby County would never win the FA Cup. This mirrors the curse placed on Birmingham City F.C.

Despite reaching six FA Cup semi-finals between 1896 and 1903, including three finals, they never managed to win the trophy. The next time they reached the final was in 1946 against Charlton Athletic. In the buildup to the final, a representative from the club went to meet with Gypsies in an attempt to lift the curse. During the match, with the score tied at 1–1, the ball burst. It has since been seen by fans of the club as the moment the curse was lifted. Derby County went on to win the match 4–1.

England penalty curse
Prior to the 2018 FIFA World Cup England hadn't won a game on a penalty shootout since 1996. The curse was broken with a penalty victory against Colombia in the 2018 World Cup round-of-16. Subsequently, England lost the UEFA Euro 2020 Final to Italy in a penalty shootout. Then in the 2022 FIFA World Cup, England captain Harry Kane misses a penalty, which could have tied their quarter-final match against France. England ended up losing 2-1.

European teams against Brazil

Starting in 1998 every European team who defeats or eliminates Brazil during a World Cup knockout stages will receive a group stage elimination at the next World Cup. 1998 World Cup winners France defeated Brazil at the final were eliminated at the group stages in 2002 and again in a rematch at the 2006 World Cup where France was victorious against Brazil at the Quarterfinal were eliminated in the group stage against in 2010. At the 2014 FIFA World Cup Brazil lost to the dominant Germany 1–7 and lost to the Netherlands in a 3rd place match in that same tournament. Germany went on to be eliminated at the group stage at the 2018 FIFA World Cup while the Netherlands failed to qualify the World Cup in 2018. Brazil met Belgium at the Quarterfinal of the 2018 FIFA World Cup however Brazil lost and were eliminated from the tournament 1-2. Belgium was eliminated at the group stages at the 2022 FIFA World Cup with this result. 

Netherlands who eliminated Brazil at the 2010 tournament were to only team to survive the group stage elimination in 2014 and defeating Brazil again in a rematch in a 3rd place match before failing to qualify for the 2018 tournament.

European World Cup champions' curse

Starting in 2002, European winners of the FIFA World Cup have frequently been eliminated in the group stages of the next World Cup. As of 2018, Germany became the third World Champion in a row to bow out at the group stages of the World Cup, and the fourth in five competitions. 

1998 winners France were eliminated at the group stages in 2002.
2006 winners Italy were eliminated at the group stages in 2010.
2010 winners Spain were eliminated at the group stages in 2014.
2014 winners Germany were eliminated at the group stages in 2018.

The curse was broken in 2022 when the 2018 winners France (who started the curse by themselves) qualified for the Round of 16 after finishing first in their group. Later they would advance to the final for a 4th time but they lost to the eventual winners Argentina in a penalty shootout.

FIFA cover curse
Appearing on the cover of EA's popular FIFA video game series has sometimes been said to represent a curse, with players experiencing injury, poor form or other controversies in the year following their appearance on the cover. Of course, as with the Madden and Sports Illustrated cover jinx, a player who appears on the cover of FIFA is likely to be at the peak of his career, so there is only one way to go from there — downward. Allegedly cursed players include:
Wayne Rooney (FIFA 06): fractured a metatarsal and underperformed at the 2006 FIFA World Cup, which culminated with a red card in a quarter-final loss against Portugal.
Theo Walcott (FIFA 10): was not selected for the England squad at the 2010 FIFA World Cup.
Kaká (FIFA 11): was injured and only played eleven games in the 2010–11 La Liga.
Jack Wilshere (FIFA 12): injured all season and did not play a single minute.
FIFA 19: Originally the cover star was Cristiano Ronaldo, who was then accused of rape, which caused him to be dropped from the cover. Replaced with Neymar, Kevin De Bruyne and Paulo Dybala; all had rather poor seasons.
Eden Hazard (FIFA 20): was injured for most of the season after a €100 million move to Real Madrid, calling it "the worst season of his career."
Kylian Mbappé (FIFA 21): He scored no goals in four matches at the 2020 UEFA European Championship. He then missed a penalty in a shootout against Switzerland, eliminating France in the Round of 16.

FIFA Women's World Cup hosts' quarter-finals curse
Since the first edition of the FIFA Women's World Cup in 1991, it is believed that a curse exist for every host country when they reached the quarter-finals of the FIFA Women's World Cup, with five out of six hosts failed in the last eight, except for the United States (which hosted the 1999 and 2003 editions and also the most successful one). This pattern began with China losing to Sweden in 1991, before losing again in the same stage to Norway in 2007. Sweden, as hosts of the 1995 tournament, lost to China after penalties. Germany, meanwhile, suffered the most shocking quarter-finals elimination by far, losing to Japan after extra times despite being the defending champions and hosts of the 2011 edition. Canada, hosts of the 2015 edition, fell to England in the same stage. Most recently, France, hosts of the 2019 edition, were eliminated by the United States in the last eight.

Hibernian F.C.
Scottish football side Hibernian endured a 114-year wait to win their third Scottish Cup, eventually doing so against Rangers in the 2016 final. Prior to this success, Hibs had lost ten Scottish Cup finals in a drought stretching back to 1902. Hibernian's hoodoo was made all the more noteworthy by their relative success in other major Scottish footballing honours - the Leith side won four league titles and three league cups whilst remaining fruitless in their search for Scottish Cup glory. In spite of remaining a prominent force within Scottish football and building notoriously excellent sides such as the Famous Five and Turnbull's Tornadoes, Hibs were for so long unable to lift the oldest trophy in world football.

Some Hibs fans attributed the absence of Scottish Cup success to a curse which a gypsy woman allegedly placed upon the club during the chairmanship of Harry Swan. Whilst renovation works were being carried out at Hibernian's Easter Road stadium in the 1950s, a harp crest – which had been displayed on the South Stand symbolising Hibernian's founding Irish roots – was removed and subsequently did not reappear when work had finished. During the 2015-16 season, Hibs' modern day badge (which includes the harp) was placed upon the facade of the West Stand at Easter Road. Less than eight months after the harp had been reinstated onto the walls of Easter Road, Hibernian were once again Scottish Cup winners after more than a century in the making.

Iran national team 
Iran has played in the World Cup for the first time in 1978 and has been a historically strong force in Asian football, but Iran has always fallen short since 1979. The national team, since 1979, has qualified for five other World Cup editions, but failed to progress from the group stage in all occasion; in the AFC Asian Cup, Iran's best result since 1979 has been the semi-finals; whereas their clubs have been unable to win the AFC Champions League despite reaching the final three times in that span. It is believed that football in Iran, mainly the national team, has been cursed due to the anti-human actions by the Islamic regime ruling Iran. This came to the forefront when they were eliminated after losing 1-0 to the United States during the 2022 FIFA World Cup, around the same time the Iranian government had made international news for their brutality towards those participating in the Mahsa Amini protests, which also included several players on the team.

Italy's FIFA World Cup curse 
Since Italy's successful 2006 FIFA World Cup run, they have been unable to reach the knockout stage, and have even failed to qualify for the tournament on multiple occasions. Despite Italy winning the tournament; defeating France in a penalty shootout, Zinedine Zidane's infamous headbutt to Marco Materazzi in the final is thought to be the leading catalyst of this curse. Italy had a disastrous tournament in 2010 after finishing last place in a group with Paraguay, Slovakia, and New Zealand, of which they were seen as clear favorites. While this was originally perceived to be a result of the European World Cup champions' curse (provided Italy won the previous event), lackluster results in future World Cups have refuted that case. In the 2014 FIFA World Cup, Italy were once again knocked out of the group stage by Uruguay and dark horses Costa Rica, with only England below them. In the 2018 FIFA World Cup qualification, Italy finished second in their qualifying group, behind Spain, advancing them to the playoff round where they would lose 1-0 to Sweden on aggregate, and would consequently fail to qualify for the World Cup for the first time since 1958. Poor results in Italy's last two group matches of 2022 World Cup qualifying would see them once again take part in the playoffs, this time losing 1-0 against North Macedonia. This would be the first time Italy had ever missed the competition twice consecutively. These results are only apparent in the FIFA World Cup and FIFA World Cup qualification, as Italy have excelled in other competitions, winning the UEFA European Championship in 2021 and finishing runners-up in UEFA Euro 2012, and qualifying for UEFA Nations League Finals in 2021 and 2023.

Japan national team 
Since qualifying to the first World Cup in 1998, Japan national football team have reached the round of 16 four times, but failed to advance past the phase in very agonising fashions. Japan first reached the last sixteen in 2002, but fell to Turkey by a slight 1–0 margin. In 2010, Japan were eliminated by Paraguay on penalties 5–3 after the game ended goalless. In 2018, Japan were knocked out by Belgium in an agonising style despite having taken a 2–0 lead; the Belgians staged a successful fightback to overturn the deficit in just remaining 20 minutes to win 3–2. In 2022, Japan were eliminated on penalties once again, losing to Croatia 3–1 on the spot after drawing 1–1. Three out of the four conquerors of Japan would go on to finish in third place.

On the other hand, teams that beat Japan in the round of sixteen of the World Cup also come to suffer bitterly from the effect of the curse, as teams that won against Japan subsequently decline or even fail to qualify for the next World Cup, thus making Japan unique in being the victim of a curse and also the one to bring curse on other teams. It's necessary to notice that the effect of Japan curse is not immediate but a rather slow progress. Turkey, after beating Japan in 2002 to win bronze medal, failed to qualify for every World Cup since. Paraguay failed to qualify for every World Cup since 2010 after winning against Japan on penalties. Belgium managed to qualify for the 2022 World Cup, but Belgium performed poorly and was eliminated from the group stage.

Kashima Soccer Stadium curse 
For 15 years, J1 League team Nagoya Grampus, after getting shut out 5–0 against the Kashima Antlers at the Antlers' home stadium, Kashima Soccer Stadium during the 1993 J.League season opener, lost to the Antlers every time they played at Kashima Soccer Stadium for 22 straight games, including Emperor's Cup and J.League Cup matches. Grampus would finally win over the Kashima Antlers at Kashima Soccer Stadium on August 23, 2008.

Leeds United FC
Don Revie, manager of Leeds United from 1961 to 1974 and known for a having an array of superstitions and phobias, attributed a poor run of results in 1971 to a gypsy curse. The curse was apparently placed when a group of gypsies were evicted from the land upon which the Elland Road stadium was built in 1890. Revie thus invited a fortune teller named Gypsy Rose Lee to Elland Road. She went to all four corners of the pitch, scratched the grass and threw some seeds down, and over a cup of tea afterwards informed Revie that the curse had been lifted.

Lionel Messi Champions league curse

Ever since Lionel Messi win at the 2015 UEFA Champions League final with FC Barcelona he and his team has failed several consecutive Champions league knockout stages starting with 2015-16 UEFA Champions League knockout phase where they were eliminated by Atlético Madrid, followed by Juventus in 2017, Roma in 2018, Liverpool in 2019,
Bayern Munich in 2020, and Paris Saint-Germain in 2021. As he joined with Paris Saint-Germain in mid 2021 he would still fail on the knockout stages by Real Madrid at the 2022 edition and most recently in 2023 by Bayern Munich making 7 eliminations for him at every knockout stage.

Liverpool F.C.
Liverpool goalkeeper Bruce Grobbelaar claimed in interviews that the reason why Liverpool hadn't won the league since the 1989–90 season was because a witch-doctor put a curse on the club from ever winning the league in a testimonial match for Grobbelaar in 1992 and that the only way to break the curse was to urinate on the four goalposts at the Anfield stadium. In a December 2019 interview, Grobbelaar revealed to have splashed urine on all four goalposts at Anfield after a charity match in May; he had been caught urinating on the posts at the Kop end in 2014. His confession came as Liverpool won the 2019–20 Premier League with 99 points.

Mexico national team (Cachirules scandal/Round of 16 curse)
The Mexico national football team were eliminated from every FIFA World Cup at the round of 16 stage from 1994 to 2018, losing to Bulgaria in 1994, Germany in 1998, the United States in 2002, Argentina in 2006 and 2010, Netherlands in 2014, and Brazil in 2018. Mexican fans name it «The curse of the Fifth game», which was believed to be traced from the cachirules scandal, in which four Mexican players were discovered falsifying their age, resulting in Mexico being disqualified from the 1988 Summer Olympics in South Korea, the 1989 FIFA World Youth Championship in Saudi Arabia, and the 1990 FIFA World Cup in Italy – thus the fourth match was believed to be cursed as the result. 

At the 2022 FIFA World Cup, Mexico did not advance from the group stage after they were eliminated after group play for the first time since 1978. Interestingly, Mexico's elimination in the 2022 World Cup was the first time in 44 years (equivalent to more than four decades), having suffered four games without scoring, began with Mexico's 2–1 win over South Korea (hosts of the 1988 Olympics) in 2018 before finally beating Saudi Arabia (hosts of the 1989 Youth World Cup) by the same scoreline in 2022 – Mexico scored four goals against their Asian opponents, having accumulated four points like Poland but lost on goal difference, which coincided to the number of players that was found guilty for the cachirules scandal, leading to an ironic rumour that the curse might have finally ended for the Mexican side.

Mick Jagger curse
When singer Mick Jagger openly supports a team or attends a game supporting a team, the supported team has suffered losses. The curse was widely speculated and reported on during the 2010, 2014 and 2018 World Cups.

Netherlands' FIFA World Cup curse
The Netherlands national football team has been a frequent participant in the FIFA World Cup, pioneered the concept of Total Football, and produced players such as Johann Cruyff, Johan Neeskens, Marco van Basten, Ruud Gullit, Dennis Bergkamp and Arjen Robben, but has never won the trophy. The team were runners-up in 1974, 1978 and 2010. The women's team reached the final of the FIFA Women's World Cup in 2019, but also failed to win the trophy.

Additionaly, Netherlands also reached the final of the 2019 UEFA Nations League Finals, but lost to Portugal.

Raith Rovers Inverness curse 
Raith Rovers have not defeated Inverness Caledonian Thistle in a Scottish league fixture since the year 2000. Raith's record at the Caledonian Stadium is a particular focus of the curse, with Raith last recording a win in Inverness on 28 October 2000. During the period of the curse, the two sides have played each other thirty times in the league. In recent years, the final ten minutes of the fixture have become synonymous with ever-more improbable comebacks from Inverness. A number of youth players for Inverness have also enjoyed breakout performances in the fixture, including Logan Chalmers, Daniel MacKay and Roddy MacGregor.

Red, white and black play-off curse
Teams who traditionally wear red and white striped shirts and black shorts are said to be cursed in the English Football League play-offs. Between the inception of the play-offs in 1987 and 2020, clubs who use those colours made 33 play-off appearances and all failed to win promotion. In that time, Brentford and Sheffield United both lost in four play-off finals, and Exeter City, Sunderland and Lincoln City lost three finals apiece. One exception occurred in 1990, when Sunderland lost to Swindon Town, but were subsequently awarded the promotion place due to financial irregularities involving Swindon. The curse was beaten in 2021, when Brentford beat Swansea City to win promotion to the Premier League. A day later, Lincoln City lost the League One play-off final to Blackpool. In 2022, Sunderland ended their own curse with victory in the League One play-off final. As of 2022, teams who wear red and white striped shirts have a play-off success rate of 8.8%.

Saudi Arabia national team
The Saudi Arabia national football team is one of the most prominent names in Asia, having qualified for six FIFA World Cups and three time champions at the AFC Asian Cup. Saudi Arabia was the second national team from Asia to win and progress from the group stage of a FIFA World Cup.

Since then, Saudi Arabia has failed to live up with expectation. The Asian powerhouse last reached the final of an Asian Cup in 2000, but was denied of the silverware by Japan. In the World Cup, all of Saudi Arabia's best result since 1994 was the group stage elimination in 1998, 2002, 2006, 2018 and recently 2022; in particular, the 2022 edition was the most painful for Saudi Arabia as the Asian powerhouse inflicted one of the greatest wins in World Cup history, a 2–1 shock win over eventual champions Argentina in the opener, only to still finish bottom in the end with subsequent defeats to Poland and Mexico.

There have been several explanations to explain for Saudi Arabia's football curse since the 21st century, however, it is widely believed that Saudi Arabia's rudeness and its disrespect for other national teams and other countries are thought to be the reasons for the repeated failures of Saudi team. It's also believed that Saudi Arabia suffered from the delusion of power due to its massive oil wealth, leading to the Kingdom's refusal to allow its players to transfer abroad, which has also contributed to the Kingdom's ongoing World Cup knockout stage and Asian Cup drought.

Scotland national team
The Scotland national football team has participated in eight FIFA World Cups, as well as three UEFA European Championship, but has always been eliminated from the first round regardless of any competitions they have participated. The same issue happens to the Scotland women's national football team, when it was eliminated from the group stage of UEFA Women's Euro 2017 and 2019 FIFA Women's World Cup despite having chances to progress.

South Korea national team (fake gold medal curse)
The South Korea national football team won the first two editions of the AFC Asian Cup title, in 1956 and 1960. On the latter occasion they were also the host nation. After winning in 1960, the entire team went to receive their gold medals, only to find the medals were fake, as the money for real gold was stolen by a corrupt official. The players then demanded that the Korea Football Association acquire real gold medals, but no one took responsibility for the issue for 50 years. Some Korean fans believed the national team was cursed by this action of the KFA – the national team has not won an Asian Cup title since. In that time South Korea lost four finals, against Iran, Kuwait, Saudi Arabia and Australia. The KFA tried to undo the curse by giving medals to the surviving players of 1960 and their relatives (still not completed), but as of the 2019 AFC Asian Cup, they have yet still failed to win it again.

Tunisia's FIFA World Cup curse
Tunisia national football team qualified for the first World Cup in 1978, where they put up their best performance with a win over Mexico and a draw with West Germany, which was attributed to the increasing number of African slots in the FIFA World Cup. Since then, however, Tunisia has been unable to live up with expectation, as their subsequent participation in 1998, 2002, 2006, 2018 and 2022 all ended in failure, having failed to advance past the group stage. This was best highlighted in the 2022 edition, when Tunisia suffered a shock 1–0 loss to the supposedly weakest team in their group, Australia, even conceded a goal from a player playing in J2 League, which was the key reason for Tunisia's eventual group stage exit despite heroic win over France in the last match.

UEFA Champions League's curse
Since rebranding in 1992, no teams in the UEFA Champions League, except for Real Madrid, have managed to defend the trophy they won in the previous season.

UEFA Cup Winners' Cup holders' curse
In the 39-year history of the UEFA Cup Winners' Cup, no team won successive titles. Eight teams reached the following final as winners of the previous edition, including the first two defending title holders, but none successfully retained the trophy.

Australian rules football

Cheltenham cemetery curse
For a long time, the SANFL club the Port Adelaide Magpies had a period of prolonged dominance at Alberton Oval. It was widely commented that opposition teams became cursed as they passed by Cheltenham cemetery on the way to the ground.
Malcolm Blight, as coach for Woodville, played up the curse for his players in the lead up to a match, parking the bus in front of the cemetery, and making his players walk past it. Woodville lost the ensuing match, but Blight maintained that the team would have lost by more if he had not forced the team to walk past the cemetery.

Colliwobbles

The Colliwobbles refers to the failure of the Collingwood Football Club to win a single premiership from the years 1958 to 1990, despite appearing in nine Grand Finals during that time. Following their famous upset victory against Melbourne in 1958, Collingwood went on to lose the next 8 grand finals, including a hat trick of losses in 1979, 1980 and 1981. Two particular examples of the supposed curse include 1970, where Collingwood were leading arch-rivals Carlton by 44 points at half time, but went on to lose the match by 10 points (the largest half-time turnaround in Grand Final history), and in 1977, wherein Collingwood drew with North Melbourne in the Grand Final, before losing the replay the next week by a hefty margin, The term Collywobbles was first coined by Lou Richards. The curse was ended in 1990 after Collingwood ended their 32 year long drought by defeating Essendon. However Collingwood has continued to be cursed when playing grand finals in September having  lost 4 grand finals since 1990 such as 2002, 2003, 2011 and most notably 2018 where after kicking the first 5 goals of the match they lost by 5 points thanks to a kick from Dom Sheed in the dying minutes of the game to seal a famous victory. Collingwood's only other premiership came in 2010 following a draw the week before. Collingwood only two premiership since 1958 have both occurred in October.

Curse of Norm Smith
The Curse of Norm Smith is the name given to the curse that was supposedly behind the Melbourne Football Club's premiership drought from 1964 until 2021. Partway through the 1965 VFL season, the Melbourne Football Club sacked coach Norm Smith. The sacking came as a massive surprise, as Smith was and still is considered one of the greatest coaches in VFL/AFL history, and under his tenure Melbourne were the most dominant club in the competition, participating in 8 Grand Finals, including a record seven consecutive grand finals from 1954 to 1960, for six premierships. The reasons for the sacking were vague, but mostly centered around concerns that his personality was becoming bigger than the club itself, as well as an incident in 1963 where he was sued by umpire Don Blew for defamation. Smith was soon reinstated after fan backlash and a collapse in the team's performance, however the damage was done and his relationship with the Melbourne board was ruined, he left for good in 1967. The ignominious way in which the sacking was performed has become fodder for a "curse" within club folklore as the reason behind the club's inability to win another premiership for 57 years. Melbourne would fail to make the finals for the next twenty-two seasons (1965 to 1986). They also won seven wooden spoons and only appeared in two grand finals (1988 & 2000, in both instances being beaten by large margins) from 1965 to 2020.

Numerous other unfortunate events in the history of the Melbourne Football Club have also been attributed to the curse, such as Jim Stynes' after the siren free kick giveaway in Melbourne's 1987 Preliminary Final match against the Hawthorn Hawks, which allowed Hawthorn player Gary Buckenara to kick the winning goal, as well as serious knee injuries to players including David Schwarz and Christian Petracca. In 2021, after 57 years (ironically the same age of Smith when he died in 1973), the curse was broken when Melbourne won the 2021 AFL Grand Final over the Western Bulldogs by the biggest margin in the club's history, in a game played in Perth.

Kennett curse

This is the name given to AFL club 's 11 match losing streak against rivals , from the 2008 AFL Grand Final to the 2013 preliminary final. After the Hawks won the 2008 premiership, then-Hawthorn President Jeff Kennett proclaimed that Geelong "lacked the mentality to defeat Hawthorn in big games". From that time, however, Geelong defeated Hawthorn eleven times in a row, most games being decided by 10 points or less. The winning streak was also attributed to comments made by Paul Chapman that the Cats will "never lose to them again" following the 2008 Grand Final. Chapman missed Hawthorn's curse-breaking win in 2013 due to suspension.

Baseball

Boston Red Sox

Some allege that there was a curse placed on the Boston Red Sox, who failed to win a World Series after 1918, apparently due to the selling of Babe Ruth to the New York Yankees. Before the sale, the Red Sox had won four titles in seven years (1912–1918). After the sale, the Yankees went on to win 27 World Series Championships. The "curse" was broken when, after 86 seasons, the Red Sox defeated the St. Louis Cardinals 4 games to 0 in the 2004 World Series (before the Series, the Red Sox had come back from a 3-games-to-0 deficit, a first in Major League postseason history, to defeat the Yankees at the original Yankee Stadium for the American League pennant).

Chicago Cubs and White Sox

Both of Chicago's baseball teams were involved in supposed curses.  The Chicago Cubs, after benefiting from a baserunning error by New York Giants' Fred Merkle during the last couple of weeks in the season, won the 1908 World Series.  From 1909 to 2015, the Cubs did not win a World Series, despite participating as the National League (NL) champion seven times between 1910 and 1945.  The 1945 World Series appearance was most notable because it marked the start of the Curse of the Billy Goat. That incident involved Billy Sianis, owner of the Billy Goat Tavern, who was asked to leave a World Series game vs. the Detroit Tigers because his pet goat's odor bothered other fans.  From 1946 to 2015, the closest the Cubs had advanced to the World Series was five outs away in game 6 of the 2003 NLCS vs. the Florida Marlins, when Steve Bartman, a Cubs fan, attempted to catch a foul ball. The Cubs defeated the Los Angeles Dodgers in the 2016 National League Championship Series (NLCS), winning the organization's first National League (NL) pennant since 1945. The Cubs finally won the 2016 World Series against the Cleveland Indians, their first championship in 108 years.
The Chicago White Sox were said to have been cursed because of their role in fixing the 1919 World Series. As a result, the Cincinnati Reds won that series in eight games, and eight White Sox players were banned by baseball for their actions in throwing the series.  The White Sox wouldn't win another World Series until 2005, when they swept the Houston Astros in four games.

Cleveland Guardians

This curse supposedly prevents the Cleveland Guardians (formerly Indians) from competing in a pennant race, reaching postseason play, or winning the American League (AL) pennant and/or World Series.

Hanshin Tigers

This curse was supposedly cast on the Hanshin Tigers by Colonel Harland Sanders (the founder and mascot of Kentucky Fried Chicken) after fans of the team threw his statue into the Dōtonbori Canal while celebrating the Tigers' 1985 Japan Championship Series, not to be recovered until 2009.

San Francisco Giants

This curse is an alleged hex placed on the San Francisco Giants following their move from New York City and refers to Coogan's Bluff which is a cliff that overlooked the former site of the Polo Grounds, which was the Giants' home in New York. In 1921, the Giants honored Eddie Grant, the first Major League Baseball player killed in World War I, with a plaque in centerfield, but the plaque was lost during the field invasion by fans that followed the Giants' final game at Polo Grounds at the end of the 1957 season.

Since then, the Giants, who had won five World Series titles, all but the first with the Eddie Grant plaque in centerfield, lost in their next three World Series appearances, including the '89 Series that was delayed because of the Loma Prieta earthquake. Two of those series losses were in the seventh game.

The Giants were approached on multiple occasions with offers to replace the plaque, but the management refused, citing a preference to keep the team's New York history separate. But the team eventually relented, installing a replica of the original plaque in AT&T Park on Memorial Day, 2006. A club official at the time said, "Baseball fans are so superstitious, and players are too, so you have to take this stuff seriously. And if by putting up a plaque we can break some sort of curse, who's to say it's not the right thing to do?"

The Giants' 2010s dynasty represented their first World Series championships in San Francisco. It should be mentioned that all three victories were won on the road, away from San Francisco.

Gaelic Games

Mayo GAA

The Curse of '51 allegedly prevents Mayo from winning the Sam Maguire Cup ever again, or at least until the death has occurred of every member of the last winning team from 1951. It remains unbroken—despite the team reaching the final on eleven occasions since then, they have either completely collapsed on the day or been undone by a series of other unfortunate events.

The legend tells us that while the boisterous Mayo team were passing through Foxford on the victorious journey home, the team failed to wait quietly for a funeral cortège to pass by on its way to the graveyard. The presiding priest consequently put a curse on Mayo football to never win a subsequent All-Ireland Final until all members of the 1951 team are dead.

In 1989, Mayo reached their first All-Ireland Senior Football Championship Final since their last victory in 1951 only to lose to Cork. In 1996, a freak point by Meath at the end of the final forced a replay, which saw Mayo concede another late score that would deny them victory. Kerry bridged an 11-year title gap against them in 1997 with a three-point win, before torturing them by eight points in 2004 and thirteen points in 2006.

Mayo returned to the All-Ireland Senior Football Championship Final in 2012. Even with Taoiseach Enda Kenny in Rome seeking divine intervention through Pope Benedict XVI the day before, the "Kafkaesque black farce" continued from where it had left off—with Donegal allowed bridge a 20-year gap between titles, helped in no small part by a nightmare opening quarter for Mayo as Michael Murphy—whose father is from Mayo—launched a rocket of a shot into the goal after three minutes. Then, in the eleventh minute, Colm McFadden seized the ball from the grasp of Kevin Keane and slid it into the net for a second Donegal goal. Mayo only got on the scoresheet after sixteen minutes and never led at any point during the match. They eventually lost with thirteen points to Donegal's two goals and eleven.

They lost again in 2013, this time by a single point to Dublin.

They qualified for the 2016 Final on 18 September 2016 where they faced Dublin the curse seemingly struck again when they scored two own goals in the opening half before drawing with Dublin in the last few minutes of the game. They faced Dublin again in a rematch on 1 October 2016 but lost by a point.

Mayo appeared again in the 2017 Final on 17 September 2017 and in the 2020 Final on 19 December 2020 where they faced Dublin  in both finals. The curse continues to strike and Mayo lost both finals. In the 2021 Final Mayo lost to Tyrone, having missed a penalty and several goal chances.

Following the death of Fr Peter Quinn in January 2016 and Dr. Pádraig Carney in 2019 two living members of the 1951 All Ireland winning team remained: Paddy Prendergast and Mick Loftus. Mick Loftus was a sub but didn't play. Prendergast died in September 2021, leaving Loftus as the last and only remaining of the 1951 winning team. At the time of Prendergast's death, Mayo had reached 11 All-Ireland finals since 1951, and lost every one.

Biddy Early
Biddy Early was a 19th-century healer from Feakle in County Clare. Her curse or prophecy was said variously to afflict two hurling teams which endured long droughts in the All-Ireland Senior Hurling Championship: Clare (1914–1995) and/or Galway (1923–1980). The two counties played a famous semi-final in the 1932 Championship: Clare won, but lost the final to Kilkenny. After Clare's "curse" was broken in 1995, Billy Loughnane from Ennis wrote to The Irish Times, denouncing the idea of a curse as preposterous, mainly because Early died in 1872 before the GAA was even founded.

Ice hockey

Calgary Flames
A significant losing streak the Calgary Flames had during games played in Anaheim has come to be referred to as the "Honda Center Curse". After winning game 3 of the 2006 Western Conference Quarter Final at the then Arrowhead Pond on April 25, 2006, the Flames have gone on to lose an NHL record 29 consecutive away games at the Arrowhead Pond/Honda Center, including all 27 games played there under the arena's current name (the arena became Honda Center starting in the 2006–07 season ). Of these 29 losses, 2 came in the remaining games of the 2006 Western Conference Quarter Final, 3 came in the 2015 Western Conference Semi Final, and 2 came in the 2017 Western Conference Quarter Final. Furthermore, the Flames last regular season win in Anaheim came on January 19, 2004. The Flames losing streak at the then Arrowhead Pond/Honda Center has led some Ducks fans to taunt the Flames with chants of "You can't win here!".
On October 9, 2017, the Calgary Flames beat the Ducks 2–0, ending a NHL record 29 (25 in regular season) consecutive away game losing streak including the Stanley Cup Playoffs at the then Arrowhead Pond/Honda Center.

Chicago Blackhawks

A curse allegedly placed on the Chicago Blackhawks in 1927 by head coach Pete Muldoon when he was fired, stating that they would never again finish in first place. The "curse" was first mentioned in print in 1943 by Toronto sportswriter Jim Coleman. They would not finish in first place in their division (1928–1937) or in the single-division NHL (after 1938) until 1967, the final season of the Original Six era, despite winning the Stanley Cup three times since Muldoon supposedly "cursed" the team. However, immediately after this, Coleman admitted that he had completely fabricated the "curse" to break a writer's block.

New York Rangers

The Curse of 1940 was a mythical explanation for the failure of the NHL's New York Rangers to win the Stanley Cup since . The curse supposedly began after the Rangers won the Stanley Cup in 1940, which was the same year the team's owners had paid off their mortgage for their home arena, Madison Square Garden, and the owners celebrated by burning the mortgage contract in the bowl of the Cup.

Toronto Maple Leafs
After winning the 1967 Stanley Cup Finals, the Toronto Maple Leafs remain (as of 2022) the only Original Six team to have never played in the Stanley Cup Finals since the NHL expanded to 12 teams the following season. Their drought of 54 seasons (excluding the lockout-cancelled 2004–05 season) without a championship is the longest in NHL history. Under Ballard, the Maple Leafs let go of key players such as Dave Keon, Lanny McDonald and Darryl Sittler while still competitive during the 1970s. Ballard also went through 13 different head coaches and six general managers during his ownership, resulting in a decade-long drought without a winning season (1979–1992) despite seven playoff appearances.

Canada's Stanley Cup curse
In the years since, five different teams from Canada have made the Stanley Cup Finals without winning the trophy: the Vancouver Canucks ( and ), Calgary Flames, Edmonton Oilers, Ottawa Senators, and Montreal Canadiens. The NHL's expansion into the warm-weather Sun Belt made it difficult for Canadian teams to compete for the Stanley Cup, with teams such as the Anaheim Ducks, Carolina Hurricanes, Dallas Stars, Los Angeles Kings, and Tampa Bay Lightning already winning at least one Stanley Cup since. In fact, three of these teams won the Stanley Cup at the expense of a team from Canada; the Lightning in 2004 and 2021, the Hurricanes in 2006, and the Ducks in 2007. The Canucks' losses in the Stanley Cup Finals came against Original Six teams with lengthy title droughts: the New York Rangers in 1994, and the Boston Bruins in 2011.

Motor sports

Andretti family

Since winning the Indianapolis 500 in 1969, auto racing legend Mario Andretti was plagued with bad luck in his efforts to win the great race for a second time before his retirement in 1994. The misfortune at Indianapolis has notably extended to his sons Michael and Jeff, nephew John, as well as grandson Marco. It is also said to have affected, to an indirect extent, his twin brother Aldo, and former car owners Paul Newman and Carl Haas from Newman/Haas Racing.

Michael Andretti has won the race five times as an owner, but three times the respective driver subsequently defected to a rival team the following year.

Bike No. 1 curse 
In MotoGP, every champion were granted rights to use number 1 on their bike for their title defense season. However, since 1998, most of champion who defend their titles using the number are unable to defend their title in the title defending season.

In 1999, Spanish rider Àlex Crivillé won the championship after Mick Doohan, who was using number 1 on his bike suffered a career ending incident during the title fight. Crivillé would later failed to defend his title the next year after using the same number on his bike in 2000. The next year, the defending champion Kenny Roberts Jr. also failed to secure his title after using the same number. 6 years later, defending champion Nicky Hayden, who won the championship in 2006 also failed to defend his title using the number after numerous incidents he suffered in 2007. The next year Casey Stoner also suffered the same fate. 9 years after Stoner, defending champion Jorge Lorenzo also unable to defend his title after switching his bike number from 99 to 1.

Home grand prix curse 
A number of drivers have apparently poor luck when racing in their home grands prix, with notable examples being Jenson Button, Mark Webber, Rubens Barrichello and Charles Leclerc. Barrichello had qualified third or higher five times, including three pole positions during his 19 starts at the Brazilian Grand Prix, but out of these attempts, his best result was third in the 2004 running of the race, with the remainder of the attempts seeing either Barrichello dropping down the order or ending up retiring. Leclerc, meanwhile, has only finished his home grand prix Monaco Grand Prix once, with him retiring from all other starts in his home race including his entry in the FIA Formula 2 Championship in 2017, and also failing to start from pole position in the 2021 running of the race.

One-off livery curse 
A number of drivers and teams had also suffered misfortunes running a one-off livery in race weekends. At the 2008 Brazilian Grand Prix, David Coulthard's final F1 race ended in retirement in a first lap collision when his Red Bull was sporting a Wings for Life charity livery.

The Jaguar Racing team ran a special one-off livery at the 2004 Monaco Grand Prix promoting the release of Ocean's Twelve, with a $300,000 diamond mounted on each of the cars. The curse struck when driver Christian Klien crashed on the first lap resulting in the diamond lost and never recovered, while Mark Webber retired later with a gearbox failure.

Mercedes ran a special retro livery to celebrate 125 years in the sport at the 2019 German Grand Prix, but the curse took hold when Lewis Hamilton broke his front wing, spinning and ended up in ninth place having started from pole position while Valtteri Bottas crashed out.

Talladega Speedway

NASCAR racetrack Talladega Superspeedway has been said to have been cursed by a Native American shaman; other stories claim that it was built on an Indian burial ground. The curse allegedly explains the high number of unusual occurrences, untimely deaths, and spectacular accidents that have plagued the track since its opening in 1969 (part of this alleged curse has a rational underpinning; Talladega is the largest racetrack in NASCAR, allowing for much faster and more dangerous racing). During the 1970s, on the eve before a race, roughly a dozen cars were sabotaged with gas tanks being filled with sugar or sand, and tires were slashed as well. Bobby Isaac, the 1970 Cup champion, parked his car mid race despite nothing being wrong with the car. When asked why, Isaac claimed a voice from above ordered him to park the car.

Other sports

Canadian curling

In the 1972 Air Canada Silver Broom curling tournament, Robert LaBonte, the skip of the American team, accidentally kicked the stone belonging to the Canadian team at the end of the match. This put the match into an extra end, and Canada won one more point to win the championship. Canada did not win another World Championship until 1980, and this was said that LaBonte put a "curse" on Canada.

Coastal Challenge Cup
Since the inception of the Coastal Challenge Cup Whanganui United Cricket Club have progressed to no less than four championship deciders and have ultimately failed to capture a title. Some link it to the pressure others link it to an inability to travel to Paraparaumu.

The BasedGod's Curse

In May 2011, Oklahoma City Thunder small forward Kevin Durant tweeted an insult directed at cult rapper Lil B, a.k.a. "The BasedGod," in which Durant expressed incredulity at the idea that Lil B had become "relevant". In response, Lil B tweeted out the BasedGod's Curse, claiming that Durant would never win the NBA championship. The two men have exchanged further insults and basketball-related challenges on Twitter. In June 2012, Lil B claimed on Twitter that he had lifted the curse; however, in February 2014, during the NBA All-Star Game in which Durant was playing, Lil B resumed insulting Durant on Twitter, implying that the curse had returned. Lil B later released a diss song directed at Durant entitled "F KD". in 2016, the Thunder blew a 3–1 lead in the Western Conference Finals to the Golden State Warriors. In the offseason, he left for the Warriors. On July 4, 2016, following that announcement, Lil B rescinded the curse again. In the 2017 NBA Finals, the Warriors beat the Cleveland Cavaliers in five games to win the NBA championship, giving Durant his first ever title.

St George Illawarra Dragons
In the National Rugby League (NRL), the Canberra curse referred to the St. George Illawarra Dragons' constant inability to defeat the Canberra Raiders at their home ground, or anywhere else, between 2000 and 2014. The Raiders enjoyed an unusual dominance of the Dragons, winning matches between the pair on a regular basis regardless of which team enjoyed favouritism or home ground advantage. This curse came to an end in Round 23, 2014, with the Dragons winning 34–16; it was their first win over the Raiders in Canberra since 2000, overall since 2007, but just their second since 2001.

Masters Tournament

The Masters Tournament held annually at the Augusta National Golf Club in Augusta, Georgia begins with an informal par-3 competition. No winner of this has ever gone on to win the main tournament the same year. Eleven golfers have won both the contest and the Masters, with two of them winning the Masters later in the career after winning the contest. Raymond Floyd came the closest to winning both in 1990, but he lost in a sudden-death playoff.

World Snooker Championship

In snooker, the "Crucible Curse" refers to the fact that no first-time winner of the World Snooker Championship has successfully defended his title since the event was first held at the Crucible Theatre in Sheffield in 1977. Of the 18 first-time champions in this era, only two have even made the final the following year, and six were eliminated in their first match. The "curse" can even be seen in the pre-Crucible era—the three first-time champions between the start of the championship's "modern era" in 1969 and its move to the Crucible all lost in their respective semifinal matches the next year. All three players went on to win a championship at the Crucible, and all failed to retain their title after their first victory at that venue.

Curse of the rainbow jersey

In cycle racing, the "curse of the rainbow jersey" is a popular term referring to the phenomenon where cyclists who have become World Champion (who wear the rainbow jersey during their reign as world champion) often suffer from bad luck the next year.

The van Gerwen curse
In 2020 and 2021, a phenomenon known as the "van Gerwen curse" was discussed in darts. In PDC Major events, anyone who knocked out top player Michael van Gerwen would subsequently lose in the next round. Players who fell to the curse in this way included Simon Whitlock (three times), Dave Chisnall, Jonny Clayton, Ian White and Glen Durrant. The curse was finally broken by Clayton, who beat van Gerwen in the 2021 Masters and went on to win the tournament.

Multiple sports

2012 Olympics
Reports of an "Olympic curse" were noted in French media in 2015 following the murder of Belarusian sprinter Yuliya Balykina and the deaths of French athletes Alexis Vastine and Camille Muffat in a helicopter crash during the reality show Dropped.  By April 2016, 18 of the 10,568 competitors had died but, based on mortality data for people of the competitors' average age of 26, this was actually lower than the expected death rate, which would have been seven competitors per year and a total by April 2016 of 28.

40-year Olympic curse
In 2020, due to the COVID-19 pandemic, discussions were being held regarding the fate of the 2020 Summer Olympics in Tokyo. In March 2020, Japan's finance minister called the event the "cursed Olympics", noting the cancellation of the 1940 Summer Olympics and the 66-country boycott of the 1980 Summer Olympics. The 2020 Olympics were delayed to 2021, with the possibility of cancellation if that deadline cannot be met. The Olympics went on in 2021 as planned breaking the curse.

Kenny Albert–Chicago curse
Sportscaster Kenny Albert is known to some Chicago sports fans as "The Kiss of Death" to their teams. Many games involving the Bears and Blackhawks with Albert announcing have ended in losses for both teams. Examples include Game 7 of the 2014 Western Conference Final between the Blackhawks and Kings, and many Chicago Bears' games with Albert announcing since 2004.

Atlanta, Georgia
Prior to the 2021 World Series, Atlanta, Georgia had won only one "Big Four" league professional sports championship; the 1995 World Series.

The National Football League (NFL)'s Atlanta Falcons won their first division championship in 1980 and were favored against the Dallas Cowboys in the Divisional playoff game. Despite trailing 24–10 at the beginning of the fourth quarter, the Cowboys rallied to out-score the Falcons 20–3 in the quarter to defeat the Falcons 30–27. In 1998, the Falcons advanced to play in the club's first-ever Super Bowl game after upsetting the heavily favored Minnesota Vikings in the NFC Championship Game 30–27; however, the Falcons lost to John Elway (in his final game) and the Denver Broncos 34–19 in Super Bowl XXXIII. In 2010 and 2012 the Falcons held the number 1 seed in the NFC playoffs, but were upset by the Green Bay Packers and San Francisco 49ers, respectively. The latter occurred in the NFC Championship Game, where the Falcons held a 17–0 lead. In Super Bowl LI, the Falcons' second-ever Super Bowl appearance, Atlanta jumped out to a 28–3 lead over Tom Brady and the New England Patriots. However, the Falcons suffered by far the greatest collapse in Super Bowl history (25 points; the previous record was 10) and lost to the Patriots 34–28 in the first Super Bowl game to ever be decided in an overtime period. Their woes continue in the 2020 season by, historically, blowing back to back 15+ point leads as well as scoring an accidental touchdown with a minute left on the clock that gave Matthew Stafford and the Detroit Lions an opportunity to drive the field and score a go-back-ahead touchdown. A notable new addition to the curse is the trading of Atlanta Falcons star player Julio Jones to the Tennessee Titans, who themselves have a fair share of sports curses.

Consistently fielding one of the best teams in Major League Baseball, the Atlanta Braves won 14 straight division titles from 1991 to 2005, but won the World Series only once (1995). In the 1996 World Series, the Braves seemed poised to win their second straight championship after jumping out to a 2–0 series lead going home. However, the Braves lost 4 straight games to the New York Yankees, including a Game 4 in which they held a 6–0 lead at one point. The Braves have only played in one World Series since; in 1999, where they were swept in four games by the New York Yankees. Since then, the Braves have played in the NLCS only twice. Notable examples of the Atlanta sports curse as it pertains to the Braves include Lonnie Smith, Ed Sprague, Charlie Leibrandt (in back-to-back World Series), Jim Leyritz, Eric Gregg's wide strike zone, Brooks Conrad's errors, blowing an 8 1/2 game Wild Card lead in September 2011, the 2012 National League Wild Card Game, the 2019 National League Division Series, and blowing a 3–1 series lead in the 2020 NLCS. (Interesting to note is that the Braves were also ahead 2–0 earlier in the series, and at that time teams that went up 2–0 in a best-of-seven LCS had a series win–loss record (from 1985 to 2019) of 28–3, the latter ironically was also the lead Falcons blew in Super Bowl LI.)

The National Basketball Association (NBA)'s Atlanta Hawks have not played in an NBA Finals since the club's move from St. Louis, Missouri in 1968. Their first appearance in the Eastern Conference Finals was against the Cleveland Cavaliers in 2015, in which they were swept four games to zero despite being a 60-win team and the number one seed in the conference. The Hawks returned to the Eastern Conference Finals in 2021, only to have their star player, Trae Young, injured in the Eastern Conference Finals against the Milwaukee Bucks. Due to this (among other factors), they would end up losing the series.

In addition, Atlanta has lost two National Hockey League (NHL) franchises to Canadian cities: the Atlanta Flames (who moved to Calgary in 1980) and the Atlanta Thrashers (who moved to Winnipeg in 2011), either due to low attendance, poor ownership, or both. In both cases, the Atlanta team failed to so much as win a playoff round (the Thrashers never won a playoff game).

The 2017 Georgia Bulldogs college football team blew a 13-point lead at halftime in the 2018 College Football Playoff National Championship to Alabama and lost in overtime, 26–23, despite Alabama benching their starting quarterback, Jalen Hurts, at halftime in favor of Tua Tagovailoa. Later that year, in the 2018 SEC Championship Game, Georgia once again blew a 14-point lead to Alabama in the same venue as their National Championship loss and once again also losing to the backup quarterback (this time Hurts, who replaced an injured Tagovailoa).

Atlanta's Women's National Basketball Association (WNBA) team, the Atlanta Dream, has also fallen victim to the city's curse. The Dream have reached the WNBA Finals on three occasions (2010, 2011, and 2013) but have been swept three games to zero each time.

Off the field, the curse has found its way towards athletes as well. Eugene Robinson, who played for the Falcons during the 1998 season, was arrested for soliciting a prostitute the night before Super Bowl XXXIII. Michael Vick's arrest for involvement in an illegal dog fighting ring came while he was still with the Falcons. Thabo Sefolosha, the Hawks' star defender in 2015, was arrested in New York City weeks before the beginning of the NBA playoffs and suffered a fractured tibia while being detained. In April 2021, the Braves were stripped of the 2021 MLB All-Star Game due to a recently passed bill in Georgia that resulted in alleged voter suppression.

However, the Major League Soccer (MLS)'s Atlanta United FC won the MLS Cup in just their second season, in 2018. Though the MLS is not considered to be one of the "Big Four" major sports leagues in North America, some believe the curse was broken with this victory.

In 2021, the Atlanta Braves, despite numerous injuries, inconsistent first-half performances, and Marcell Ozuna's off-the-field incident, won the 2021 World Series, putting a definitive end to the curse.  Additionally, a few months later, the Georgia Bulldogs finally ended their 41-year title drought, further adding to the end of the curse.

Buffalo, New York

The Buffalo sports curse is an explanation for Buffalo's inability to win a Super Bowl, Stanley Cup, or an NBA championship. Those who believe in the Buffalo curse cite as examples the four consecutive Super Bowl losses by the Buffalo Bills for the 1990–1993 seasons (and the team's failure to qualify for the NFL playoffs from 2000 to 2017), as well as the failure of the Buffalo Sabres ever to win the Stanley Cup (despite winning the Presidents' Trophy for most regular-season points in 2006–07; the Sabres have failed to win a playoff series since 2007, and has not appeared in the playoffs since 2011). The Bills, however, won two American Football League (AFL) titles (1964 and 1965), the latter occurring just months before an agreement was reached to merge the AFL and the National Football League (NFL) (Bills owner Ralph Wilson initiated the talks to merge the two leagues, according to the Pro Football Hall of Fame). In spite of that, it has been argued that this was achieved when the AFL was in its infancy as an upstart league, garnering little, if any, national attention before merging with the established NFL, and that even if they are considered to be at par, since there would be no Super Bowl until after the 1966 season, the Bills could be no greater than co-champions. There have been conflicting suggestions on how the Bills would have fared against the Green Bay Packers or Cleveland Browns, much as there have been disputes over how well the San Diego Chargers would have played against the Bears in 1963, had the Super Bowl existed at that time.

Some writers and historians specifically attribute the Bills' lack of success to the location of their current stadium next to a family cemetery and very likely on the site of an old Wenro Indian village. There are others who link the Bills' 17-year playoff drought to the benching of quarterback Doug Flutie for the game now known as the Music City Miracle, which was also their last playoff game until 2017. One non-supernatural cause of the alleged curse was Bills owner Ralph Wilson, who cared more about running a profitable business than a winning team; Wilson was quoted in 1969 as explicitly not wanting to win championships because it would cause his players to demand more money.

The earliest reference to the curse traces to 1921, when the city's first NFL team, the Buffalo All-Americans, lost the NFL championship that year to what is now the Chicago Bears on a controversial tiebreaker. Other teams based in Buffalo, such as the Buffalo Bandits, Buffalo Bisons, Buffalo Beauts and Western New York Flash, have all won championships in their respective leagues, and athletes from Buffalo (with the possible exception of heavyweight boxing contender Joe Mesi), when playing for teams outside of Buffalo, have not been affected and have won multiple championships.

Cleveland, Ohio

Prior to 2016, Cleveland was particularly known for not winning a championship in any major sport since 1964, as well as repeatedly losing playoff games in heartbreaking fashion.  Although the Cleveland Browns won the 1964 NFL Championship Game, the match occurred two seasons prior to the first Super Bowl and six before the AFL–NFL merger. More than fifty years after winning their last league title, the Browns remain one of only four teams yet to play in the NFL title game during the modern era. More recently, the Cleveland Indians lost the 1995, 1997, and 2016 World Series, and the Cleveland Cavaliers were swept in both the 2007 and 2018 NBA Finals. In 2004, ESPN.com ranked Cleveland "the most tortured sports city in America". In 2012, Cleveland Scene dubbed the city's sports struggles "The Curse of Chief Wahoo", a reference to continued use of the controversial logo. (Chief Wahoo was eventually retired in 2018, with the Indians renaming themselves the Cleveland Guardians in 2022.)

The Cleveland curse was "broken" when the Cavaliers defeated the Golden State Warriors in Game 7 of the 2016 NBA Finals, thereby ending Cleveland's 52-year championship drought.

Drake curse
The Drake curse is a sports curse attributed to rapper Drake. Endorsement from Drake, including wearing a team's or player's jersey, publicly declaring support for a team or attending a game has resulted in a loss or negative outcome for players and teams. Teams and athletes supposedly affected by the curse include Alabama football, Conor McGregor, the Toronto Raptors, Kentucky basketball, Juventus F.C., Serena Williams and Anthony Joshua. In 2019, after the Toronto Raptors defeated the Philadelphia 76ers with a buzzer-beater from Kawhi Leonard, it was revealed Drake was wearing 76ers shorts in order to use the curse to his advantage.

The Drake curse was briefly lifted on June 13, 2019, when the Toronto Raptors defeated the Golden State Warriors in game six of the 2019 NBA Finals to win the series 4-2 and claim their first NBA championship and the country's first championship since the 1993 World Series when the Toronto Blue Jays defeated the Philadelphia Phillies in the 4–2 series.

The Phoenix Suns became the latest team to suffer the Drake Curse as of 2021 when they lost to the Milwaukee Bucks (who broke the city's 50-year championship struggle) in 2021 NBA Finals, losing 4–2.

The curse was again broken in 2022 when the Los Angeles Rams beat the Cincinnati Bengals in Super Bowl LVI after Drake had bet on the Rams to win the Super Bowl. However, the curse struck once again as Ferrari's Formula One driver Charles Leclerc, who was leading the race, retired from the 2022 Spanish Grand Prix due to engine problems after Drake placed a bet on Leclerc winning. The curse also returned during the 2022 FIFA World Cup, when Alphonso Davies posted a photo with the rapper on Instagram ahead of the tournament. Not helping matters was the songs that Team Canada used during matches such as "Started from the Bottom" as their entrance song and "Going Bad" (which featured Drake) as their goal song. Canada ended up being knocked out of the tournament after three consecutive losses in the group stage.

Gillette
Marketing experts have highlighted the "curse of Gillette", given the mishaps that happen to sports stars which are associated with the brand, most notably Tiger Woods, Thierry Henry and David Beckham. One notable exception to the curse is the New England Patriots, who have played at Gillette Stadium since 2002 and have won six Super Bowls in that time frame.

Gold Coast, Queensland

The Gold Coast is notorious for having teams perform poorly in the major Australian sports leagues and either fold, rebrand or relocate shortly after. Most of the city's sports teams have never reached the Grand Final of any major sports league in Australia, let alone win a premiership/championship. The Gold Coast is often referred to as "the graveyard" due to the number of professional sports teams that have folded in the city. The teams will often fall into trouble over poor on field performances, financial problems, ownership issues and/or under performing shortly after signing a marquee player. One of the city's two current professional teams fell dangerously close to suffering the same fate in 2015 as Australian media outlets reported they were trying desperately to avoid the curse.

Kim kardashian Curse

Minneapolis–Saint Paul, Minnesota

Since the Minnesota Twins won the 1991 World Series, the four main sports teams based in the Minneapolis–Saint Paul metropolitan area (Minnesota Vikings, Minnesota Timberwolves, Minnesota Wild, Minnesota Twins, and formerly the Minnesota North Stars) have been unable to win a championship, whether it's a Super Bowl, Stanley Cup, NBA Finals, or World Series.

The Minnesota Vikings have appeared in four Super Bowls but have yet to win any. They also played in six NFC Championship games since 1976, the year they lost Super Bowl XI to the Oakland Raiders and the last time they made the Super Bowl. However, they have been unable to win any. The closest the Vikings came to winning the NFC Championship game since that span is the 1998 NFC Championship game and 2009 NFC Championship game. In 2003, the Vikings missed the playoffs despite having a 6–0 with Nate Poole catching a game-winning touchdown pass from quarterback Josh McCown to miss the playoffs. In 2016, the Vikings had a 5–0 start but were eliminated from the playoffs following a 38–25 loss to the Green Bay Packers. In 2017, the Vikings advanced to the NFC Championship following a game-winning play from wide receiver Stefon Diggs, but were blown out 38-7 by the Philadelphia Eagles.

Since the Minnesota Timberwolves was established in 1989, they have yet to play in any NBA Finals or win it, with the closest being the 2003–04 season, making it the only season in which the Timberwolves won a playoff series. Following that season, they would fail to make the playoffs until the 2017–18 season. They would make the playoffs again during the 2021–22 season, but would lose in six games to the Memphis Grizzlies, including a blown 26-point lead in game 3 and a 10-point lead in game 6.

Philadelphia, Pennsylvania

The "Curse of Billy Penn" was cited as a reason for Philadelphia sports teams' failure to win championships since the Philadelphia 76ers swept the Los Angeles Lakers in the 1983 NBA Finals. Some fans believe that the city's breaking of a gentlemen's agreement in 1987, that no building in Philadelphia be built higher than the statue of William Penn on the top of the spire of City Hall, put a curse on the city.

When the final beam in the construction of the Comcast Center, was raised on June 18, 2007, iron workers of Local Union 401 attached a small figurine of William Penn to the beam in an attempt to break the curse. The following year, the Philadelphia Phillies won the 2008 World Series. Ten years later, when the even taller Comcast Technology Center was topped out, the iron workers on that skyscraper did the same thing and the Philadelphia Eagles would go on to win Super Bowl LII.

The city's sports teams have also lost in championship finals in years of presidential inaugurations, beginning with the 76ers' loss in the 1977 NBA Finals and includes the Phillies' loss in the 2009 World Series. During that span, each of the four city's teams have lost championships during such years twice.

San Diego, California
The city of San Diego has never claimed a modern North American major league professional sports championship (Super Bowl, World Series, Stanley Cup, or NBA Finals). San Diego is currently home to Major League Baseball's San Diego Padres and was the home of the National Football League's San Diego Chargers from 1961 to 2016 (now located in Los Angeles). San Diego has never had a National Hockey League franchise (although they did have a team in the rival World Hockey Association in the 1970s). The city has previously hosted two teams from the National Basketball Association: the San Diego Rockets from 1967 to 1971 (now located in Houston, Texas), and the San Diego Clippers from 1978 to 1984 (now located in Los Angeles).

Since 2016 when the Cleveland Cavaliers won an NBA championship, San Diego became the city with the longest championship drought in North America with at least one major league franchise. San Diego's only championship was the 1963 AFL Championship, when the Chargers beat the Boston Patriots 51–10, before the AFL merged with the NFL to form the current National Football League.

The Chargers would only appear and lose in three championship games since then. The Chargers were set to defend their 1963 AFL title in 1964 against the Buffalo Bills. However, a key play by Mike Stratton on Keith Lincoln would help the Bills win, 20–7. The next year, the Chargers played the Bills again in the championship game and were shut out 23–0. The quarterback for the Bills (and the game MVP) in both of those games was former Charger Jack Kemp (and incidentally, those two championships would also be Buffalo's last). In 1966, team owner and founder Barron Hilton was forced to sell off the team to appease the board of directors of Hilton Hotels. Since Hilton sold the team, the Chargers have only had one Super Bowl appearance, in 1994, when they lost 49–26 to the San Francisco 49ers, as San Francisco quarterback and eventual MVP Steve Young threw for a Super Bowl–record six touchdowns. Additionally, eight members of that 1994 Chargers team, including team captain Junior Seau, died before the age of 45. Since appearing in the Super Bowl, the Chargers have fielded some dominant teams that appeared to be Super Bowl-type teams, only to take an early playoff exit. In 2004, the Chargers finished 12-4 and hosted the New York Jets in the Wild Card Game, but they lost the game in overtime 20-17 despite rallying from a 17-7 fourth quarter deficit. In 2006, the Chargers finished a league-best 14-2 and clinched the 1 seed in the AFC Playoffs. They hosted the New England Patriots in the Divisional Round. Late in the fourth quarter, with the Chargers leading 21–13, Patriots quarterback Tom Brady threw an interception to Marlin McCree, which likely would've clinched victory. However, he was stripped of the ball by Patriots wide receiver Troy Brown and the Patriots recovered and took over in Chargers territory. The Patriots were able to tie the score at 21 and ultimately won the game 24–21 on a late field goal. This has since gone down as one of the greatest "what-ifs" in Chargers history, going down as "what if Marlin McCree holds on to the ball?". In 2007, the Chargers finished 11-5 and won the AFC West once again, and this time were able to advance to the AFC Championship Game. Despite praise from the media for Philip Rivers playing through a torn ACL he had suffered the previous week in the Division Round win over the Indianapolis Colts, the Chargers fell to the 17-0 New England Patriots by a score of 21–12. Since their Super Bowl appearance in 1994, this remains the only time the Chargers have reached the AFC Championship Game since that time. In 2008, the Chargers became the first team in NFL history to start a season 4-8 and make the playoffs by winning their final 4 games, including a 52–21 victory in a win-and-in game over the Denver Broncos. After upsetting the Indianapolis Colts in the Wild Card Game, the Chargers lost to the Pittsburgh Steelers in the next round 35–24. In 2009, after a slow 2–3 start, the Chargers won their last 11 games to finish the season at 13-3 and finish as the AFC's number 2 seed. But in the divisional round against the New York Jets, the Chargers lost 17-14 which included 3 missed field goals by normally reliable kicker Nate Kaeding. After the string of 4 consecutive AFC West crowns from 2006 to 2009, the Chargers only made the playoffs once in their final 7 seasons in San Diego, in 2013 when they finished as the AFC's number 6 seed after having won 4 in a row after a 5–7 start. They beat the Cincinnati Bengals in the Wild Card Round 27–10, but lost to the Denver Broncos in the next round 24–17.

Founded in 1969, the Padres are one of six Major League Baseball franchises that have never won the World Series. Of those teams, only the Texas Rangers (1961) have been in existence longer than San Diego.  The Padres have twice advanced to the World Series, losing 4–1 to the Detroit Tigers in 1984 and being swept 4–0 by the New York Yankees in 1998. Aside from those 2 World Series appearances, the Padres have only made the playoffs 4 other times. In 1996, 2005, and 2006, they lost the NLDS to the St. Louis Cardinals. However, in 2020, they beat the Cardinals in the Wild Card Series and moved on to the NLDS, where they were swept in 3 games by the rival and eventual World Series champion Los Angeles Dodgers.

Sports Illustrated cover

Players who appear on the cover of the Sports Illustrated magazine have tended to coincidentally suffer setbacks or injuries, or lose important games, shortly after appearing on the cover.

Tennessee

The state of Tennessee has had three professional sports teams since 2001 - the Memphis Grizzlies, Nashville Predators, and Tennessee Titans. None of them have won a professional sports championship and all have a history of failure in big moments.

The Titans have been to only one Super Bowl since moving to Tennessee in 1997. In their lone Super Bowl appearance, the Titans were one yard away from tying the game but wide receiver Kevin Dyson was tackled one yard short of the endzone on the final play. Since then, the Titans have only appeared in two conference championship games (2002 and 2019), losing both in routs. In addition, every time they've been their conference's number-one seed for the playoffs (2000, 2008, and 2021), the Titans have lost their first playoff game.

The Predators, who played their first season in 1998, have consistently made the playoffs (15 times since 2004) but have only appeared in one Conference Final and Stanley Cup Final (both in 2017). They lost the Stanley Cup Final in 6 games to the Pittsburgh Penguins mainly due to the Predators’ inability to play effectively on the road in that series. The team is also frequently eliminated from the playoffs at home, including in 2017. They are also 0–5 in the playoff series against the San Jose Sharks and Arizona Coyotes who both also have a history of failing in the postseason.

The Grizzlies, after moving from Vancouver in 2001, have never won a conference finals game, only appearing in that series once (in 2013) and had to wait 21 years to win their first division title.

The Tennessee Volunteers football team was virtually irrelevant from 2008 to 2021 on a national level since firing former head coach Phillip Fulmer. In 2016, after starting 5-0 for the first time since their last national championship season, the Vols had a chance to play in the Sugar Bowl if they won their final regular season game, but instead lost that game to Vanderbilt. In 2022, after starting 8-0 and being ranked #1 in the College Football Playoff standings, the Volunteers lost in blow out losses to Georgia and South Carolina, ultimately ending any chance they had of making the 4-team playoff. In addition, their Heisman candidate quarterback Hendon Hooker tore his ACL in the loss to South Carolina.

Washington, D.C.
The city of Washington, D.C. did not win a major professional sports championship for 26 years, between the Washington Redskins' Super Bowl XXVI victory in 1992 and the Washington Capitals' win in the 2018 Stanley Cup Finals. None of the major sports teams qualified to play in a conference or league championship game or series between 1998 and 2018, for a total of 70 combined seasons. This was the longest such streak in combined seasons of any city with at least one major sports team. Of cities with three or more major sports teams, D.C. had the second-longest title drought, and the longest time without an appearance in the conference finals. Between the Capitals' 1998 trip to the Eastern Conference Finals and the team's trip to the Eastern Conference Final in 2018, Washington, D.C. sports teams had appeared in 16 quarterfinal playoff rounds, losing all 16. Further, Washington sports teams held a 13-game losing streak in games with the chance to send the team to a Conference or League Championship. The drought ended on May 7, 2018, when the Capitals defeated the Pittsburgh Penguins in Game 6 of the semifinals to advance to the Eastern Conference Final against the Tampa Bay Lightning. The Capitals would go on to defeat the Lightning four games to three in the Eastern Conference Final, and then defeated the Vegas Golden Knights four games to one in the Stanley Cup Final. To further confirm the end of the curse, the Washington Nationals won the franchise's first World Series in 2019 with all four of those wins in that series on the road - the first such occurrence among professional sport in North American championships.

References

 
Urban legends